Maja Valborg Eriksson (born 1 May 1991) is a Swedish handball player who started her handball in Flottans IF where she played until 2010. She after that played for H 43 Lundagård but only one year. She left Lund for Skövde HF, playing for them in five seasons before she became a professional ballplayer and played for Team Tvis Holstebro. She was professional only for 2 years before she returned to Sweden and played for Önnereds HK in Gothenburg. 2020 she went to Skara HF and come back to her trainer 2011-2016 in Skövde HF Magnus Frisk.After two years in Skara HF she stopped playing handboll in 2022.

References

1991 births
Living people
People from Karlskrona Municipality
Swedish female handball players
Sportspeople from Blekinge County